The Guardian was a short-lived newspaper published in London from 12 March to 1 October 1713.

It was founded by Richard Steele and featured contributions from Joseph Addison, Thomas Tickell, Alexander Pope and Ambrose Philips. Steele and Addison had previously collaborated on the Tatler and The Spectator (after which the present-day Spectator and Tatler are named).

Button's Coffee House in Russell Street, Covent Garden, acted as an ad hoc office for the newspaper. Contributors submitted written material in a marble lion's head letterbox, said to have been designed by the artist William Hogarth, for possible publication in The Guardian.

The Gentleman's Magazine followed on the heels of The Guardian, being touted by Richard Steele as a sequel of it.

References

External links
Scanned books available online:The Guardian Vol 1 The Guardian Vol 2

Defunct newspapers published in the United Kingdom
Publications established in 1713
Publications disestablished in 1713
1713 disestablishments in Great Britain
1713 establishments in England